Wila Pukara (Aymara wila blood, blood-red, pukara fortress, "red fortress", also spelled Wila Pucara) is a mountain in the Bolivian Andes which reaches a height of approximately . It is located in the La Paz Department, Aroma Province, Sica Sica Municipality.

References 

Mountains of La Paz Department (Bolivia)